Carville Dickinson Benson (August 24, 1872 – February 8, 1929) was a U.S. Congressman who represented the second Congressional district of Maryland from 1918 to 1921.

Early life
Carville Benson was born near Halethorpe in Baltimore County, Maryland, Benson attended preparatory schools and Lehigh University of Bethlehem, Pennsylvania, in 1890.  He graduated from the law department of University of Baltimore in 1893, and was admitted to the bar the same year.

Career
Benson served as a member of the Maryland House of Delegates from 1904 to 1910 and again in 1918, serving as Speaker of the House in 1906.  He also served as a member of the Maryland State Senate from 1912 to 1914.

In 1918, Benson was elected as a Democrat to the Sixty-fifth Congress to fill the vacancy caused by the death of Joshua Frederick Cockey Talbott, and was re-elected to the Sixty-sixth Congress, serving from November 5, 1918, to March 3, 1921.  He was an unsuccessful candidate for reelection in 1920 to the Sixth-seventh Congress.

After Congress, Benson resumed the practice of law in Baltimore, Maryland, and resided in Halethorpe. He was appointed the State insurance commissioner of Maryland in 1924 and served until his death.

Personal life
Benson died on February 8, 1929, in Baltimore. He is interred in Cedar Hill Cemetery of Brooklyn, Maryland.

External links

1872 births
1929 deaths
People from Baltimore County, Maryland
Lehigh University alumni
University of Baltimore alumni
Maryland lawyers
Democratic Party members of the Maryland House of Delegates
Democratic Party Maryland state senators
Democratic Party members of the United States House of Representatives from Maryland
19th-century American lawyers